Musa Kabiru (born 16 June 1986) is a Nigerian professional footballer who plays as a midfielder.

Club career 
He began his career with Kaduna United. Musa Kabiru joined the Egyptian club, Al-Mokawloon Al-Arab, before the start of the 2009-10 Egyptian Premier League season.

In August 2013 Musa signed for Azerbaijan Premier League side Ravan Baku. However the transfer fell through as due to problems with the players documentation, and Musa went on to sign for fellow Egyptian team Olympic El Qanah. Musa scored in his second game for El Qanah, a 1-1 draw against El-Gaish in the 2013–14 Egyptian Premier League.

International career 
He  played for the Home-based Nigeria national football team his first game was on 3 December 2008 against Ghana national football team in an African Nations Championship qualifier. He scored Nigeria's two goals.

Career statistics

Club

Honours 
Individual
 Lebanese Premier League Best Foreign Player: 2015–16

References

External links
 
 
 
 
 

1986 births
Living people
Nigerian footballers
Kaduna United F.C. players
Association football forwards
Al Mokawloon Al Arab SC players
Nigerian expatriate footballers
Expatriate footballers in Egypt
Nigerian expatriate sportspeople in Egypt
Egyptian Premier League players
El Qanah FC players
Expatriate footballers in Lebanon
Nigerian expatriate sportspeople in Lebanon
Lebanese Premier League players
Nejmeh SC players
Tadamon Sour SC players
Expatriate footballers in Jordan
Nigerian expatriate sportspeople in Jordan
Jordanian Pro League players
Al-Salt SC players